Anne Matthes (born 30 April 1985) is a German female volleyball player. She was part of the Germany women's national volleyball team.

She participated at the 2010 FIVB Volleyball Women's World Championship in Japan. She played with PVF Matera.

Clubs
  PVF Matera (2010)

References

Sources

External links
 
 
 

1985 births
Living people
German women's volleyball players
Place of birth missing (living people)
20th-century German women
21st-century German women